Michael Freeling is an American geneticist and plant biologist. He is currently a professor in the Department of Plant and Microbial Biology at the University of California. He is known for early work on maize anaerobic metabolism, developmental genetics of the maize ligule, proposing the grasses as a single genetic system model with Jeffrey Bennetzen, and the discovery of biased gene retention following whole genome duplications in plants. In 1994 Freeling was elected to the National Academy of Sciences. In 2017 he was awarded the McClintock Prize for Plant Genetics and Genome Studies.

Education and career 

Freeling was born in Portland, Oregon in 1945. He attended the University of Oregon graduating with an A.B. in 1968. He then join Drew Schwartz's research group at the University of Indiana where he also worked with Marcus Rhoades. Completing his PhD in 1973 he was hired by the University of California, Berkeley as an Assistant Professor of Genetics. Freeling was promoted to Associate Professor in 1979, and to full professor in 1984. In 1980 he was selected as a Guggenheim Fellow which supported his time as a visiting professor at the Rothamsted Experimental Station, in England

Research

Abiotic Stress 

In the 1980 Freeling found an early response to anaerobic conditions is the suppression of the translation of mRNAs. After several hours a small group of anaerobic peptides including alcohol dehydrogenases are produced instead. He also found that the cytoplasmic acidosis was a good predictor of how poorly plants can tolerate flooding stress.

Comparative Genomics 

Freeling and Jeffrey Bennetzen proposed the model of the grasses as a single genetic system. Freeling developed tools for identifying conserved non-coding sequences in plant genomes and has played a role in sequencing the genomes of papaya, sorghum, banana, Brassica rapa, pineapple and strawberry.

Freeling's research group also studies ancient whole genome duplications. He identified biased gene loss between duplicated regions of the arabidopsis genome. In maize they found that genes on the copy of the genome had lost more genes tended to be expressed at lower levels than duplicate copies of the same genes on the copy of the genome which had lost fewer genes.

Trainees 

Between 1973 and 2014 Freeling was the mentor for 27 PhD students and 49 postdocs, including three who went on to also be elected to the National Academy of Sciences.
 Julia Bailey-Serres Professor at University of California, Riverside and National Academy Member
 Jeffrey Bennetzen Professor at University of Georgia and National Academy Member
 Sarah Hake Professor at University of California, Berkeley and National Academy Member
 Robert A. Martienssen HHMI Investigator at Cold Spring Harbor Laboratory
 Neelima Sinha Professor at University of California, Davis

References 

Indiana University alumni
University of Oregon alumni
People from Fort Wayne, Indiana
University of California, Berkeley College of Natural Resources faculty
American geneticists
Members of the United States National Academy of Sciences
1945 births
Living people